Conospermum polycephalum is a shrub endemic to Western Australia.

It blooms between July and September producing blue-white-pink flowers.

It is found in the Wheatbelt region of Western Australia where it grows in gravelly soils over laterite.

References

External links

Eudicots of Western Australia
polycephalum
Endemic flora of Western Australia
Plants described in 1848